Hostinský is a Czech language  occupational surname for an innkeeper. Notable people with the name include:
 Bohuslav Hostinský (1884–1951), Czech mathematician and theoretical physicist
 Otakar Hostinský (1847–1910), Czech historian

Czech-language surnames
occupational surnames